Albert Henry Broome (30 May 1900 - December 1989) was an English footballer. His regular position was as a forward. He was born in Unsworth, Bury, Lancashire. He played for Oldham Athletic and Manchester United.

External links
MUFCInfo.com profile

1900 births
1989 deaths
English footballers
Manchester United F.C. players
Oldham Athletic A.F.C. players
Footballers from Bury, Greater Manchester
Association football forwards